Deborah Sussman (May 26, 1931August 20, 2014) was an American designer and a pioneer in the field of environmental graphic design. Her work incorporated graphic design into architectural and public spaces.

Early life and education 

Deborah Sussman was born in Brooklyn, New York on May 26, 1931. Her father worked as a skilled commercial artist.

Sussman took classes at the Art Students League and attended summer school at Black Mountain College in 1952. She studied acting and painting at Bard College in New York. In 1951 she attended the Institute of Design in Chicago that was established in 1939 by Bauhaus painter and photographer László Moholy-Nagy (1895-1946), where she earned a degree in graphic design, . She went on to earn a Doctorate of Humane Letters from Bard College in 1998.

Career 

In 1953, Sussman began her career in the offices of Charles and Ray Eames, where she worked as an office designer. She worked for approximately 10 years with the Eameses, and during the course of that decade, she worked as art director for the office, designing print materials, museum exhibits, films, and showrooms for furniture. Sussman designed instructions for the card construction game House of Cards and traveled to Mexico to document folk culture for the Eameses' 1957 film Day of the Dead. She won a Fulbright Scholarship that allowed her to study at the Ulm School of Design in Germany.

In 1968, Sussman started her own practice. Four years later, in 1972, she met and married architect and urban planner Paul Prejza. Sussman and Prejza formed the firm Sussman/Prejza & Co. in 1980 in Santa Monica, CA before moving to Culver City, CA in1986. Their "urban branding" projects included city identities for Philadelphia and Santa Monica, as well as the look and architectural landscape of the 1984 Summer Olympics in Los Angeles.

In 1983, Sussman helped found the AIGA chapter of Los Angeles with Saul Bass and others.

In Stylepedia, authors Steven Heller and Louise Fili wrote that the graphical elements of that Olympics "epitomized a carnivalesque modernity" and placed the work in the Pacific branch of the New Wave design movement. The firm also designed Hasbro's New York facility, and has worked with the City of Santa Monica, the Museum of the African Diaspora, Disney World, and McCaw Hall. The company was later renamed Sussman-Prejza. 

Sussman was known for her bold and colorful work that includes an integration of typography in the environmental landscape. She was awarded an AIGA medal in 2004. In 2013 the WUHO Gallery hosted the first retrospective of Deborah Sussman's early work, spanning her days at Eames Studio up to the 1984 Olympics.

Sussman was named a Fellow at the Society for Experimental Graphic Design in 1991, and she was later recognized with SEGD's Golden Arrow Award in 2006.

Her archives is now at (1931-1968) is now owned by the Getty Research Institute.

Work

1984 Olympic Games 

Before Sussman became involved, the 1984 Olympic design consisted of a red, white, and blue "star-in-motion" logo that was considered inappropriate because of its nationalistic expression of the United States. Sussman and her designers, along with the Los Angeles Olympic Organizing Committee, decided a new logo should express the culture of Los Angeles and Southern Californiaparticularly Mexico, Japan, Indonesia, and India. By combining the traditional elements of the U.S. flag with new colors and forms, they achieved what architect Jon Jerde referred to as "Festive Federalism." In total, there were 150 designs creating the visual language for the 1984 games. This work won Time magazine's award for "Best of the Decade."

Other design contributions 

 Identity and branding applications for the Gas Company of Southern California
 Wayfinding systems for Walt Disney Resorts
 Wayfinding systems for Philadelphia
 Seattle Opera
 McCaw Hall
 Exhibit design for the Museum of the African Diaspora
 City of Santa Monica 
 Big Blue Bus 
 Designed the identity of the Cleveland Cavaliers in 1993

Death 

Sussman died of breast cancer at the age of 83 on August 19, 2014.

References

External links 

 
 Sussman interview, December 11, 2013, designboom.com; accessed August 22, 2014.
 AIGA Medalist

American graphic designers
1931 births
2014 deaths
California people in design
Women graphic designers
AIGA medalists
Artists from Brooklyn
Bard College alumni
Black Mountain College alumni
Deaths from cancer in California
Deaths from breast cancer
20th-century American artists
20th-century American women artists
21st-century American women